Wildenberg is a municipality  in the district of Kelheim in Bavaria, Germany.

References

Kelheim (district)